Apart is the seventh album by composer Paul Schütze, released in 1995 through Virgin Records.

Track listing

Personnel 
Denis Blackham – engineering, mastering
Richard Misrach – photography
Paul Schütze – instruments, production, recording

References 

1995 albums
Paul Schütze albums
Virgin Records albums
Albums produced by Paul Schütze